Pothuganti Ramulu is an Indian politician and a member of parliament to the 17th Lok Sabha from Nagarkurnool Lok Sabha constituency, Telangana. He won the 2019 Indian general election being an Telangana Rashtra Samithi candidate.

Early life and education 
Ramulu has born in Gunduru Village at Kalwakurthi Mandal in 1952. He has done his schooling up to 7th standard at Gunduru Village and then he stopped for one year, Later he as continued his studies till Post-Graduation and worked as Government Teacher for 16 years and then he has resigned to the Job and entered into politics 1994 by joining TDP (Telugu Desam Party) with inspiration of Ex. Minister Mahendranath Who is also represented Achampet in Andhra Pradesh Assembly prior to Ramulu.

References

Living people
India MPs 2019–present
Lok Sabha members from Telangana
Telangana Rashtra Samithi politicians
People from Nagarkurnool district
1952 births